Filip Tronêt (born 11 May 1993) is a Swedish footballer who plays for Västerås SK as a midfielder.

References

External links

Västerås SK profile

1993 births
Living people
IF Brommapojkarna players
Västerås SK Fotboll players
Swedish footballers
Allsvenskan players
Superettan players
Association football midfielders
Sportspeople from Västerås